{{Infobox language
| name             = Gottscheerish
| nativename       = Gottscheerisch, Kočevarščina| states           = Slovenia
| region           = Gottschee
| familycolor      = Indo-European
| fam2             = Germanic
| fam3             = West Germanic
| fam4             = Elbe Germanic
| fam5             = High German
| fam6             = Upper German
| fam7             = Bavarian
| iso3             = 
| glotto           = gott1234
| glottorefname    = Gottscheerisch
| fam8             = Southern Bavarian
}}

GottscheerishNewflashenglish.com: UN says 2,500 languages face extinction , p. 2. (Göttscheabarisch) is an Upper German dialect which was the main language of communication among the Gottscheers in the enclave of Gottschee, Slovenia, before 1941. It is occasionally referred to as Granish or Granisch in the United States (< German Krainisch 'Carniolan'), a term also used for Slovene.Zarja / The Dawn. 1996. 68(5–6) (May–June), p. 27. Today there are only a few speakers left in Slovenia and around the world.

 Language history 
Gottscheerish belongs to Southern Bavarian within the Bavarian dialect group. The Bavarian dialects of Carinthia are closest to it. Gottscheerish shares a lot of properties with the Bavarian dialects of the German language islands of the eastern Alps, among them Cimbrian in Veneto, Sappada (Pladen), and Timau (Tischelwang) in Friuli-Venezia Giulia, and Sorica (Zarz) in Upper Carniola (Slovenia).

Gottscheerish developed independently for more than 600 years from the settlement of the first German-speaking settlers from Eastern Tyrol and Western Carinthia around 1330.

The Gottscheer Germans used Gottscheerish as oral language for daily communication, whereas their written language was Standard German. However, folk songs and folk tales collected in the 19th and 20th century have been published in Gottscheerish.

Already in the 19th century many speakers of Gottscheerish left their homes to emigrate to the United States. After resettlement of most Gottscheers by the German occupation forces in 1941 during the Second World War only a few hundred speakers of Gottscheerish remained in their homeland. After the war Gottscheerish was forbidden in Yugoslavia.

 Present situation 
According to the UNESCO, Gottscheerish is a "critically endangered language". The majority of its speakers live in the U.S., with a significant community in Queens, New York City. Most of them are of the oldest generation, who spent their childhood in Gottschee County. There are speakers in Canada, Austria and Germany as well, but just as in the U.S. they have hardly any opportunity to practice it. Everyday language in the family and elsewhere is English and German or the local dialect, respectively.

In Slovenia there are some families who preserved Gottscheerish in spite of the ban after World War II. Today, however, there are probably no more children learning it as first language. Most Gottscheerish speakers live in Moschnitze valley (Črmošnjiško-Poljanska dolina) between Kočevske Poljane and Črmošnjice, where some Gottscheer families collaborated with the partisan movement and therefore were allowed to stay.Pokrajinski muzej Kočevje: Vsi niso odšli / Not all of them left 

Written representation
As a primarily or exclusively spoken language, the written representation of Gottscheerish has varied considerably. The following table shows how some of the more problematic phonemes have been represented in different writing systems.

The symbol ə for schwa is frequently distorted in representations of Gottscheerish, incorrectly replaced by the partial differential symbol ∂ or umlauted ä.

Phonology
The phonological inventory of Gottscheerish differs from standard German in a number of ways, especially regarding palatal consonants. The phonological inventory here is based on Hans Tschinkel's 1908 grammar. Tschinkel does not explicitly distinguish between phonemic and phonetic status.

Consonants
Consonants in parentheses are either phonetic/positional variants, idiolect variants, or dialect variants.

In the westernmost part of Gottschee, known as the Suchen Plateau, the phonemes /s/ and /ʃ/ merged to yield /ɕ/ and the phonemes /z/ and /ʒ/ merged to yield /ʑ/. The phoneme /r/ is rarely realized as [ʁ]. The phoneme /l/ is realized as [ʟ] after front vowels and after labial/velar obstruents.

Vowels
Tschinkel gives a large vowel inventory for Gottscheerish, especially for vowel clusters. He does not strictly distinguish between phonemic and phonetic values.

Personal pronouns
The following pronouns are given in Hans Tschinkel's transcription.

Numbers
The following numbers are given in abridged form in Hans Tschinkel's transcription.

 Examples 

A text in Karl Schröer's orthography (1870):

A text partially based on Hans Tschinkel's orthography (ca. 1908):

Notes

 References 

 Bibliography 
Karl Julius Schröer: Wörterbuch der Mundart von Gottschee. K. k. Hof- und Staatsdruckerei, Wien 1870.
Adolf Hauffen: Die deutsche Sprachinsel Gottschee. Geschichte und Mundart, Lebensverhältnisse, Sitten und Gebräuche, Sagen, Märchen und Lieder. K. k. Universitäts-Buchdruckerei und Verlags-Buchhandlung ‚Styria‘, Graz 1895. S. 19-33: Die Gottscheer Mundart.
Hans Tschinkel: Grammatik der Gottscheer Mundart. Niemeyer, Halle a. S. 1908.
Walter Tschinkel: Wörterbuch der Gottscheer Mundart. 2 Bände. Mit Illustrationen von Anni Tschinkel. Studien zur Österreichisch-Bairischen Dialektkunde. Verlag der Österreichischen Akademie der Wissenschaften, Wien 1973.
Maridi Tscherne: Du höscht lai oin Hoimöt. Domovina je ena sama. Pesmarica pesmi v kočevarskem narečju. Slovensko kočevarsko društvo Peter Kosler, Ljubljana 2010.
Maridi Tscherne: Beartərpiəchla - Göttscheabarisch-Kroinarisch. Kočevarsko-slovenski slovarček. Zavod za ohranitev kulturne dediščine Nesseltal Koprivnik, Koprivnik/Nesseltal 2010.

 External links 
Gottscheer Relief Association, New York: Language Lessons. Gottscheerisch for English Speakers
Gottschee.de: Folk songs in Gottscheerish
Peter Kosler Association, Slovenia
Kultura po 700 letih na robu propada (Domen Caharijas, Dnevnik'', 17 October 2009, in Slovene), parts of the body in Gottscheerish

Languages of Slovenia
Bavarian language
German dialects